The 2009–10 Slovenian Third League was the 18th season of the Slovenian Third League, the third highest level in the Slovenian football system.
The season began on 15 August 2009 and ended on 5 June 2010.

Slovan was denied licence after the previous season.

Clubs East

League standing

Clubs West

1 Interblock B was not eligible for promotion.

League standing

See also
2009–10 Slovenian Second League

References

External links
Football Association of Slovenia 

Slovenian Third League seasons
3
Slovenia